Spandan Chaturvedi (born 25 August 2007) is a former Indian television child actress, who has had one role in a film since she became a teenager. Chaturvedi started her career with the 2012 drama series Ek Veer Ki Ardaas...Veera. After she appeared in several television advertisements. Later she was cast in Sanskaar - Dharohar Apnon Ki. Thereafter she appeared as cameo in The Suite Life of Karan & Kabir. In February 2014, Chaturvedi played the role of young Madhubala in Colors TV's show Madhubala – Ek Ishq Ek Junoon. But In August 2014 - February 2016 she portrayed the role 'Chakor' in Colors TV show Udaan, for which she became popular and won several awards, including the Zee Gold Award for Best Child Actor.

Life and career 
Spandan Chaturvedi was born on 25 August 2007 in Ulhasnagar, Mumbai, to Sunil Chaturvedi. She completed her first class studies in 2015. Chaturvedi is the cousin sister of Sparsh Khanchandani, who is also an actress.

Chaturvedi began her career with the 2012 Yash A Patnaik's drama series Ek Veer Ki Ardaas...Veera, in it she appeared in first few episodes, played the role of young Gunjan. Thereafter Chaturvedi appeared in several television advertisements. Later she played in Colors TV's programme Sanskaar - Dharohar Apnon Ki, where she played the role of Aarvi. Chaturvedi appeared as cameo in Disney Channel's comedy series The Suite Life of Karan & Kabir. In February 2014, Chaturvedi roped to play the daughter of Drashti Dhami's character in Ravindra Gautam's soap opera Madhubala – Ek Ishq Ek Junoon, in which she played the lead role of young Madhubala after twenty years leap in the show.

In August 2014, Chaturvedi featured to play the female protagonist in filmmaker Mahesh Bhatt's drama series Udaan, in which she is portraying the lead role of Chakor, a bonded labourer by birth, who faces challenges at the hands of Kamal Narayan (played by Sai Bilal), Fighting to be freed from the bonds of slavery after being mortgaged by her parents Kasturi (played by Sai Deodhar) and Bhuvan (played by Rajiv Kumar). She received fame and critical acclaim for her performance in the series, and won the Zee Gold Award for Best Child Actor, Television Style Award for Most Stylish Nanhe Natkhat and Indian Television Academy Award for Most Promising Child Star - Female (Desh Ki Ladli/Beti). While 100 episodes celebration, Chaturvedi injured herself when a marble table fell on her foot. She was hospitalised for at least ten days, and took one-and-a-half month to recover.

In February 2015, Chaturvedi appeared as a guest in K9 Productions comedy series Comedy Nights with Kapil on Colors TV.
In April 2015, Chaturvedi appeared in the print campaign of GR8! Television Magazine, she appeared along with Gautam Gulati on the cover of magazine with the hashtag "BeWithBeti".

Filmography

Television

Films

Awards and nominations

References

Living people
2007 births
People from Ulhasnagar
Actresses from Mumbai
Indian child actresses
Indian film actresses
Indian television actresses
Child actresses in Hindi cinema
Child actresses in Telugu cinema
Indian television child actresses
Actresses in Hindi cinema
Actresses in Telugu cinema
21st-century Indian child actresses
21st-century Indian actresses